The Crystal Plaza, also known as Water Cube, is a residential skyscraper located in Tamsui, New Taipei, Taiwan. It is designed by C.Y. Lee & Partners and was completed in 2013. It is the tallest building in Tamsui.

See also 
 List of tallest buildings in Taiwan
 List of tallest buildings in New Taipei City
 Blue Ocean (skyscraper)
 Ellipse 360

References

2013 establishments in Taiwan
Residential skyscrapers in Taiwan
Skyscrapers in New Taipei
Apartment buildings in Taiwan
Residential buildings completed in 2013